Dion Lopy (born 2 February 2002) is a Senegalese professional footballer who plays as a midfielder for Stade de Reims. He made one appearance for the Senegal national team in 2019.

Career statistics

Club

International

References

2002 births
Living people
Senegalese footballers
Association football midfielders
Senegal international footballers
Senegal youth international footballers
Stade de Reims players
Ligue 1 players
Championnat National 2 players
Senegalese expatriate footballers
Senegalese expatriate sportspeople in France
Expatriate footballers in France